Fire of Zamani (abbreviated as FOZ) is the second studio album by Nigerian hip hop recording artist Ice Prince. It was released by Chocolate City on October 28, 2013. The album was executively produced by Audu Maikori, Paul Okeugo, Yahaya Maikori, and Jude Abaga. It was mastered by Sean Stan of Vintage Sounds Production. The album's production was primarily handled by Chopstix, a member of Grip Boiz City, along with additional production from Don Jazzy, Jay Sleek, Sammy Gyang, and E-Kelly. It features guest appearances from Sunny Neji, Wale, M.I, Chip, Ruby Gyang, Wizkid, French Montana, Jesse Jagz, Olamide, Sound Sultan, Burna Boy, Yung L, Jeremiah Gyang, Shaydee, and Morell. The album was supported by four singles—"Aboki", "More", "Gimme Dat", and "I Swear". It was marketed to East Africans by the distribution platform Mdundo.

Background and promotion
Ice Prince first announced the album's title and release timeframe during an interview with Toolz on NdaniTV's The Juice. He said, "I'm working on an album for 2013. I can't announce the date yet but later on in the year, there will be an album called the Fire of Zamani. One of the stories I'm trying to tell is that criticism brings out the beast and fire in you. Often being criticized from my first album, I'm working on the next album like I've never worked on anything in my life before". Furthermore, he said he heard the phrase Fire of Zamani while listening to 2face's The Unstoppable album. Fire of Zamani was initially scheduled for release on September 9, 2013, in order to commemorate the victims of a 2001 Jos crisis. On October 17, 2013, Ice Prince revealed the album's artwork as a collage consisting of small posters. Four days later, he released its track listing. Fire of Zamani is available on the Spinlet platform, a digital media library application similar to iTunes.

Chocolate City held an album launch concert on November 23, 2013, at the Expo Hall of the Eko Hotels and Suites. The concert featured performances from Ice Prince, Chip, M.I Abaga, Don Jazzy, Olamide, Burna Boy, Sunny Neji, Yung L, Ruby, Morell, Jeremiah Gyang, DJ Caise and DJ Edu. In December 2013, Ice Prince held an album listening session at the Hilton Sandton in Johannesburg. He gave a detailed account of each song on the album and signed autograph copies of the album for each guest. The event was hosted by South African rapper Da L.E.S.

Singles and other releases
The album's lead single "Aboki" (Hausa: Friend) was released on August 28, 2012. The song was produced by Chopstix and celebrates some of the most successful individuals from Northern Nigeria. The music video for "Aboki" was directed by Phil Lee in Los Angeles.

The album's second single "More" was also released on August 28. Its music video was shot and directed in London by Moe Musa. British-Nigerian singer Lola Rae played Ice Prince's love interest in the video. "Gimme Dat" was released as the album's third single on April 23, 2013. The song was also produced by Chopstix and features vocals by Yung L, Burna Boy and Olamide. An alternative version of the song, featuring Wande Coal, surfaced on the internet after the release of the official version. The French Montana and Shaydee-assisted track "I Swear" was released as the album's fourth single on September 9, 2013. The music video for the song was shot and directed in the U.S by J.R Saint.

On February 20, 2014, Ice Prince premiered the Sesan-directed music video for "Jambo". On May 28, 2014, he released the music video for "Whiskey"; it was directed by Aje Filmworks and features cameo appearances from Sunny Nneji and DJ Caise. In an interview with MTV UK in April 2014, Ice Prince said he would release the music video for "Mercy", a song that features a verse from British rapper Chip. On August 6, 2014, Ice Prince released a video for the AKA-assisted remix of "N Word".

Critical reception

Fire of Zamani received mixed reviews from music critics. Reviewing for YNaija, Wilfred Okiche called the album "easily accessible and ridiculously catchy" and said it "shines as bright as Ice wants it to". In a negative review, Ayomide Tayo of Nigerian Entertainment Today gave the album 2.5 stars out of 5, saying the "lack of a solid theme running through the LP makes the whole project sound all over the place." Toye Trill of 9jaNinja granted the album 4.8 stars out of 10, adding "there were so much reggae infusion into Ice's verses, that lyrically only few songs didn't have evidence of Ice Prince's inner rasta man, for a supposed rap album."

Accolades
Fire of Zamani was nominated for Rap Album of the Year at the 2014 City People Entertainment Awards.

Track listing

Notes
"—" denotes a skit

Personnel
The following people contributed to Fire of Zamani:

Audu Maikori – executive producer
Paul Okeugo –  executive producer
Yahaya Maikori –  executive producer
Panshak Zamani – primary artist, writer
Olubowale Victor Akintimehin – featured artist, writer
Sunny Nneji – featured artist
Jude Abaga – executive producer, featured artist, writer
Jahmaal Bailey – featured artist, writer
Ruby Gyang – featured artist, writer
Ayodeji Balogun – featured artist, writer
Karim Kharbouch – featured artist, writer
Olamide Adedeji – featured artist, writer
Olanrewaju Fasasi – featured artist, writer
Damini Ogulu – featured artist, writer
Yung L – featured artist, writer
Jeremiah Gyang – featured artist, writer
Shaydee – featured artist, writer
Morell – featured artist, writer
Chopstix – mixer, producer
Michael Collins Ajereh – producer
Jay Sleek – producer
Sammy Gyang – mixer, producer
E-Kelly – producer
Sean Stan – mastering

Release history

References

2013 albums
Ice Prince albums
Albums produced by Don Jazzy
Albums produced by Chopstix
Albums produced by Sammy Gyang
Albums produced by Jay Sleek
Chocolate City (music label) albums